Sir Christopher James Hampton  (Horta, Azores, 26 January 1946) is a British playwright, screenwriter, translator and film director. He is best known for his play Les Liaisons Dangereuses based on the novel of the same name and the film adaptation. He has thrice received nominations for the Academy Award for Best Adapted Screenplay: for Dangerous Liaisons (1988), Atonement (2007) and The Father (2020); winning for the former and latter.

Hampton is also known for his work in the theatre including Les Liaisons Dangereuses, and The Philanthropist. He also translated the plays The Seagull (2008), God of Carnage (2009), The Father (2016), and The Height of the Storm (2019). He also wrote the books and lyrics for musical Sunset Boulevard (1995) and its revival in 2016. He received two Tony Awards for Book of a Musical and Best Original Score.

Early life and theatrical debut
Hampton was born in Faial, Azores, to British parents Dorothy Patience (née Herrington) and Bernard Patrick Hampton, a marine telecommunications engineer for Cable & Wireless. His father's job led the family to settle in Aden, Yemen, and Cairo and Alexandria in Egypt, and later in Hong Kong and Zanzibar. During the Suez Crisis in 1956, the family had to flee Egypt under cover of darkness, leaving their possessions behind.

After a prep school at Reigate in Surrey, Hampton attended the independent boarding school Lancing College near the village of Lancing in West Sussex at the age of 13. There he won house colours for boxing and distinguished himself as a sergeant in the Combined Cadet Force (CCF). Among his contemporaries at Lancing was David Hare, later also a dramatist; poet Harry Guest was a teacher.

From 1964, Hampton read German and French at New College, Oxford, as a Sacher Scholar. He graduated with a starred First Class Degree in 1968.

Hampton became involved in the theatre while at Oxford University. The Oxford University Dramatic Society (OUDS) performed his original play When Did You Last See My Mother?, about adolescent homosexuality. He drew from his own experiences at Lancing. Hampton sent the work to the play agent Peggy Ramsay, who interested William Gaskill in it. The play was performed at the Royal Court Theatre in London, and soon transferred to the Comedy Theatre; in 1966, Hampton was the youngest writer in the modern era to have a play performed in the West End. Hampton's work on screenplays for the cinema also began around this time. He adapted this play for Richard Attenborough and Bryan Forbes, but a film version was never made.

Stage plays and other works
From 1968 to 1970, Hampton worked as the Resident Dramatist at the Royal Court Theatre, and also as the company's literary manager. He continued to write plays: Total Eclipse, about the French poets and lovers Arthur Rimbaud and Paul Verlaine, was first performed in 1967 and at the Royal Court in 1968, but it was not well received at the time. The Philanthropist (1970) is set in an English university town and was influenced by Molière's The Misanthrope. The Royal Court delayed a staging for two years because of an uncertainty over its prospects, but their production was one of the Royal Court's more successful works up to that point. The production transferred to the Mayfair Theatre in London's West End and ran for nearly four years, winning the Evening Standard Theatre Award for Best Comedy. It reached Broadway in New York City in 1971.

His agent told him after this success: "You’ve got a choice: you can write the same play over and over for the next 30 years" or, alternatively, "you can decide to do something completely different every time". He told her that he was writing a play about the "extermination of the Brazilian Indians in the 1960s". Savages, set during the period of the military government and derived from an article "Genocide in Brazil" by Norman Lewis, was first performed in 1973. His first produced film adaptation, of Ibsen's A Doll's House (1973), was directed by Patrick Garland, and stars Anthony Hopkins and Claire Bloom.

A sojourn in Hollywood led to an unproduced film adaptation of Marlowe's play Edward II and the original script for Carrington. This period also inspired his play Tales from Hollywood (1982). This is a somewhat fictionalised account of exiled European writers living in the United States during the Second World War. (The lead character is based on Ödön von Horváth, who died in Paris in 1938). The play also explores the different philosophies of Horwath and the German playwright Bertolt Brecht (who lived in the United States in the 1940s). Hampton told The Guardian critic Michael Billington in 2007: "I lean towards the liberal writer, Horvath, rather than the revolutionary Brecht. I suppose I'm working out some internal conflict". The play was commissioned by the Center Theatre Group in Los Angeles; the Group first performed it in 1982. The play has been adapted in different versions for British and Polish television.

Later works
Hampton won the Academy Award for Best Adapted Screenplay for his screen adaptation of his play Dangerous Liaisons (1988), directed by Stephen Frears and starring Glenn Close, John Malkovich, and Michelle Pfeiffer. He worked on Carrington (1995) for 18 years, writing multiple drafts. The play explores the relationship between painter Dora Carrington and author Lytton Strachey. Hampton went on to direct the feature film Carrington, starring Emma Thompson and Jonathan Pryce.

He was appointed Commander of the Order of the British Empire (CBE) in the 1999 Birthday Honours for services to literature.

Hampton both wrote and directed Imagining Argentina (2003), his adaptation of the 1987 novel by Lawrence Thornton. It explores society during the military dictatorship of Leopoldo Galtieri, when the government conducted a Dirty War against opponents, killing many in "forced disappearances." It starred Antonio Banderas and Emma Thompson. According to Hampton, this period of Argentinian history had not inspired a dramatic work before. "I decided to do something which it would be difficult to finance at a time when, for once, I was bombarded with offers. In 2007, Hampton was nominated for a second Academy Award for his screenplay and adaptation of Ian McEwan's novel Atonement, directed by Joe Wright and starring James McAvoy, Keira Knightley, and Saoirse Ronan.

Since the 1990s, Hampton has created the English translations of the works of French dramatists Yasmina Reza and Florian Zeller. Reza's Art ran for eight years in the West End, and was also produced in the United States. Hampton translated Reza’s God of Carnage, which was the third-longest running Broadway play in the 2000s, playing 24 premieres and 452 regular performances. God of Carnage garnered six Tony nominations and three wins in 2009. God of Carnage actors James Gandolfini and Marcia Gay Harden, joined Philip Glass, Phillip Noyce and a host of other artists in a short documentary celebrating their Tony Award success and Mr. Hampton's 50 published plays and screenplays.

Hampton's translation into English of Michael Kunze and Sylvester Levay's Austrian musical Rebecca, based on Daphne du Maurier's novel of the same name, was supposed to premiere on Broadway in 2012, directed by Francesca Zambello and Michael Blakemore. The production did not open, with the producers, Ben Sprecher and Louise Forlenza, relinquishing the rights.

In 2012, Hampton joined forces with Tiana Alexandra-Silliphant to form Hampton Silliphant Management & Productions, which presented the play Appomattox at the Guthrie Theater in Minneapolis, Minnesota. The play concerns itself with historic events in the United States, 100 years apart in time: the historic meetings between Generals Ulysses S. Grant and Robert E. Lee, as well as Abraham Lincoln and Fredrick Douglass in 1865, and the later machinations of Lyndon Johnson, J. Edgar Hoover and Martin Luther King – which ultimately led to the passing of the Voting Rights Act of 1965. Appomattox was also performed as an opera with Philip Glass at The Kennedy Center in 2015.

In 2020, Hampton served as screenwriter and executive producer for The Singapore Grip, an international TV mini-series exploring the Japanese invasion of Singapore during WWII. Adapted from the novel by J.G. Ferrell, the story portrays the intrigues and ultimate upheaval of British colonialism at the time of the Fall of Singapore. 

The same year, Hampton co-wrote The Father, starring Anthony Hopkins and Olivia Colman, with Florian Zeller (based on Zeller's 2012 play Le Père), who directed the film in his feature directorial debut. The film received critical acclaim, and both Hampton and Zeller won a BAFTA and an Academy Award for Best Adapted Screenplay and received a Golden Globe nomination, while the film was nominated in the Best Picture categories.

Hampton was knighted in the 2020 New Year Honours for services to drama.

In March and April 2021, it was announced that Hampton and Zeller will co-write the adaptation of The Son (which serves as Zeller's and Hampton's follow-up to The Father) with Zeller directing, and Hugh Jackman and Laura Dern attached to star in the film.

The Son was directed by Florian Zeller from a screenplay by Zeller and Hampton. It is based on Zeller's 2018 stage play Le Fils. The film stars Hugh Jackman, Laura Dern, Vanessa Kirby, Zen McGrath, Hugh Quarshie, and Anthony Hopkins.

The Son had its world premiere at the 79th Venice International Film Festival on 7 September 2022, and is scheduled to be released in the United States on 11 November 2022, by Sony Pictures Classics.

Credits

Plays
 1964 – When Did You Last See My Mother?
 1967 – Total Eclipse
 1969 – The Philanthropist
 1973 – Savages
 1975 – Treats
 1982 – Tales From Hollywood
 1991 – White Chameleon
 1994 – Alice's Adventures Under Ground
 2002 – The Talking Cure
 2012 – Appomattox
 2019 – A German Life

Musicals (book and lyrics)
 1993 – Sunset Boulevard with Don Black (music by Andrew Lloyd Webber)
 2001 – Dracula, the Musical with Don Black (music by Frank Wildhorn)
 2012 – Rebecca (translated from German) (music by Sylvester Levay, original lyrics by Michael Kunze)
 2013 – Stephen Ward the Musical with Don Black (music by Andrew Lloyd Webber)

Adaptations
 1982 – The Portage to San Cristobal of A.H. from the novella by George Steiner
 1983 – Tartuffe by Molière
 1985 – Les Liaisons Dangereuses from the novel by Choderlos de Laclos for the Royal Shakespeare Company
 1993 – Sunset Boulevard for Andrew Lloyd Webber (book for the musical, based on the Billy Wilder film)
 2001 – Dracula, the Musical for Frank Wildhorn
 2006 – Embers from the novel by Sándor Márai
 2009 – The Age of the Fish (in German Jugend ohne Gott) from the novel by Ödön von Horváth for the Theater in der Josefstadt

Films (written and/or directed)
 1973 – A Doll's House (adaptation of the Henrik Ibsen play, directed by Patrick Garland)
 1977 – Able's Will (screenwriter; directed by Stephen Frears) for the BBC
 1979 – Tales from the Vienna Woods (screenwriter; directed by Maximilian Schell)
 1981 – The History Man (adaptation of the Malcolm Bradbury novel for the BBC)
 1983 – Beyond the Limit (screenwriter)
 1984 – The Honorary Consul (adaptation of the Graham Greene novel)
 1986 – The Wolf at the Door (screenwriter)
 1986 – Hotel du Lac (adaptation of the novel by Anita Brookner)
 1986 – The Good Father (screenwriter) based on a novel by Peter Prince
 1986 – Arriving Tuesday (producer)
 1988 – Dangerous Liaisons (play author/screenwriter/co-producer) directed by Stephen Frears)
 1989 – The Ginger Tree (adaptation of the Oswald Wynd novel for the BBC)
 1992 – Tales from Hollywood (adaptation of his play for the BBC)
 1995 – Carrington (screenwriter/director)
 1995 – Total Eclipse (play author/screenwriter/actor: The Judge) directed by Agnieszka Holland)
 1996 – Mary Reilly (screenwriter) based on the Valerie Martin novel about Dr. Jekyll's housemaid, directed by Stephen Frears and starring Julia Roberts and John Malkovich
 1996 – The Secret Agent (adaptor/ director, based on the Joseph Conrad novel)
 2002 – The Quiet American (adaptation of the Graham Greene novel)
 2003 – Imagining Argentina (screenwriter/director)
 2007 – Atonement (adaptation of the Ian McEwan novel)
 2009 – Chéri (screenwriter)
 2011 – A Dangerous Method (play author/screenwriter) based on Hampton's The Talking Cure, adapted from the John Kerr non-fiction book A Most Dangerous Method. Directed by David Cronenberg.
 2013 – The Thirteenth Tale for the BBC
 2013 – Adoration adapted from Doris Lessing's novella The Grandmothers: Four Short Novels
2016 – Ali and Nino (screenwriter) adapted from Kurban Said's novel Ali and Nino. Announced as screenwriter on 9 January 2012.
 2020 – The Father (adapted from the Florian Zeller play)
 2020 – The Singapore Grip (adaptation of Booker Prize winner J.G. Farrell's 1978 novel)
 2022 - The Son (adapted from the Florian Zeller play)

Translations
The Seagull
Uncle Vanya
Hedda Gabler
Don Juan by Molière
 1973 – A Doll's House
 1977 – Tales from the Vienna Woods, by Ödön von Horváth
 1978 – Don Juan Comes Back from the War, by Ödön von Horváth
 1989 – Faith, Hope and Charity, by Ödön von Horváth
 1996 – 'Art' by Yasmina Reza
 1998 – Enemy of the People
 2000 – Conversations After a Burial by Yasmina Reza
 2001 – Life x 3 by Yasmina Reza
 2008 – God of Carnage by Yasmina Reza
 2009 – Judgement Day, by Ödön von Horváth
 2010 – Rebecca (musical) by Michael Kunze
 2014 – The Father by Florian Zeller
 2015 – The Mother by Florian Zeller
 2016 –  by Florian Zeller
 2017 – The Lie by Florian Zeller 
 2017 – Christmas Eve by Daniel Kehlmann
 2018 – The Height of the Storm by Florian Zeller
 2019 – The Son by Florian Zeller

Librettos
 2005 – Waiting for the Barbarians, music by Philip Glass
 2007 – Appomattox, music by Philip Glass
 2014 – The Trial, music by Philip Glass

References

Bibliography
 Massimo Verzella, "Embers di Christopher Hampton e la traduzione della malinconia", Paragrafo, II (2006), pp. 69–82

External links

 
 
 Finding aid to Christopher Hampton papers at Columbia University. Rare Book & Manuscript Library.

1946 births
Living people
Alumni of New College, Oxford
Best Adapted Screenplay Academy Award winners
Best Adapted Screenplay BAFTA Award winners
British dramatists and playwrights
Commanders of the Order of the British Empire
Crystal Simorgh recipients
Fellows of New College, Oxford
Fellows of the Royal Society of Literature
People educated at Reigate St Mary's School
People educated at Lancing College
Writers Guild of America Award winners
British opera librettists
Tony Award winners
British male screenwriters
British male dramatists and playwrights
British translators